This is a list of characters for the manga and anime series Parasyte.

Main characters

Shinichi is a thoughtful, compassionate high-school boy whose hand is infected with a Parasite and is repeatedly put into difficult positions. He must find a way to peacefully coexist with Migi, the Parasite which has taken over his hand, and reconcile his desire to protect humanity from the Parasites with his desire to keep his own Parasite a secret in order to avoid being killed or used as a laboratory specimen. Like a superhero with a secret identity, he must also find a way to explain away his Parasite-fighting activities, as well as the stress and grief they cause him, to his friends and family. While originally forced to have Migi fight for him, Shinichi later gains heightened abilities when trace cells of the Parasite course through his body, and fights his own battles, with the two having an advantage in both being able to act independently and work as a team. Shinichi's retention of his humanity, despite gradually becoming emotionally distant as a side-effect of Migi's cells, makes most of the other Parasites deem him a threat. After defeating Gotou, with Migi deciding to "go to sleep" indefinitely afterward, Shinichi attempts to live a normal life again while having an understanding of natural order from his experience, and starts dating Murano.

Masanori Harada, a 20-year-old student, wrote to the editor of the Monthly Afternoon noting that Shinichi acts calm when he is threatened and that he is "not human anymore!" Iwaaki responded, stating that Shinichi is accustomed to "close calls" partly because Migi calms Shinichi down during battle. The statement and response were printed in the April 1993 Monthly Afternoon.

Shinichi is portrayed by Shota Sometani in the film.

Unlike "successful" Parasites, Migi has no desire to kill humans for sustenance, and is nourished by the food Shinichi eats, however he suffers from fatigue and regularly falls asleep for four hours at a time, leaving Shinichi vulnerable. Migi is, like other Parasites, completely without emotion. His primary consideration is survival, and he has threatened (and in some cases attempted) to kill other humans who pose a threat to his and Shinichi's secrecy. When he and Shinichi were first coming to terms, he even threatened to remove Shinichi's other limbs in order to render him unable to place the two of them in danger. Migi can be reasoned with, however, and has just as much reason to be mistrustful of other Parasites as does Shinichi. On the other hand, unlike Shinichi, Migi has no inclination to place himself at risk in order to protect other humans from Parasites. But Migi gradually evolves over the course of the series, he becomes more human while able to temporarily separate from Shinichi's body. After the final battle with Gotou, having been absorbed by the Parasite prior to his defeat, Migi's composition is greatly altered to the point that enters a deep sleep though he briefly woke up to save Satomi without Shinichi's realization.

Iwaaki explained that while Migi appears to be Shinichi's weapon, in fact Migi is in control of the battle and orders around Shinichi. Iwaaki explained that Migi is easily able to order Shinichi since Shinichi is young and "needs guidance", while Migi would find difficulty if he became a part of a politician or a president of a company since in that scenario Migi and his host would argue a lot.

An 18-year-old from Saitama Prefecture named "Midari" asked in the letters to the editor that if Migi took Shinichi's left hand, if he would have been named "Hidari". Iwaaki answered that it would be Hidari, but Iwaaki felt that the name would be similar to those of Bokuzen Hidari or Tenpei Hidari and the name would "bring to mind a doddering old man, so that wouldn't have been a good idea". Iwaaki then said that the first man to climb Mount Everest "had a name an awful lot like that..."

Migi is voiced by Sadao Abe in the film.

Humans

Shinichi's best friend and love interest. She is a thoughtful, tender-hearted young girl who cares deeply for her friends. While Satomi and Shinichi are mutually attracted towards one another, their relationship is strained to the breaking point when Shinichi’s life is thrown in turmoil by the Parasites. Shinichi never told her he was a parasyte and she never finds out. However, the two of them do end up together for the second half until a new girl, Kana, shows up in the picture. From the moment she is introduced, Satomi is depicted as being romantically attracted towards Shinichi due to his kind and sensitive nature.  Consequently, she is utterly grief-stricken as she watches him grow ever more cold and withdrawn over the course of the story. Despite her best efforts to find out the reason behind Shinichi’s behavior, Satomi becomes increasingly estranged from him as he desperately strives to keep her in the dark about Migi and the Parasite threat. As a result, she begins to question whether any trace of the gentle, caring boy she originally fell in love with remains.  After losing nearly all hope, Satomi’s faith in Shinichi is completely restored upon witnessing him crying freely while protectively cradling Reiko’s orphaned baby in his arms. Upon learning that Shinichi is part Parasite at the end of the series, Satomi firmly proclaims this does nothing to diminish his humanity because he still regards all life as precious.

Satomi is played by Ai Hashimoto in the film.

Kana is a disobedient "bad girl" who initially hangs out with Mitsuo but develops a crush on Shinichi. She is attracted to him because of his sensitive personality, and because she can sense something "different" about him. In reality, Kana has the inexplicable psychic ability to sense parasytes. However, her senses are not as fine tuned as those of the Parasite themselves. Kana mistakes this sense as a psychic connection to Shinichi, believing it was fate leading her to her true love. This ability eventually leads to her death when she is told about the Parasite, but stubbornly refuses to believe the truth until, thanks to her ability, she comes face to face with a parasyte that kills her just before Shinichi came to save her. Her death brings a total breakdown of Shinichi for some time.

One of Satomi's two best friends. Her brother works as a criminal profiling illustrator for the police department. Due to her seeing her brother's sketches of Parasites and her crush on Hideo Shimada, she ended up at the center of a highly dangerous situation.

The other of Satomi's two best friends, who has a minor crush on Shinichi.

A cannibalistic serial killer who has the ability to distinguish between humans and Parasites, believing himself to be the definition of human nature and able to point out a killer. He is brought in by the military to help them in their operation to exterminate the Parasites in East Fukuyama City, but escapes when the military unit is slaughtered by Gotou. He returns at the end of the series, taking Satomi hostage to confront Shinichi to see if he has the same world views as he does.
Uragami is played by Hirofumi Arai in the film.

Kazuyuki is Shinichi's father. Shortly after his wife was killed by a Parasite, he had some suspicions as to whether or not Shinichi was infected (although he never said so outright).

Nobuko is Shinichi's mother, expressing concern over her son's strange behavior. She dies early on when she is decapitated by a Parasite that needed a compatible body to transfer to when her male replacement body started to reject her. As the Parasite assumed Nobuko's appearance, Shinichi let himself open and got himself nearly killed in the initial encounter. But Shinichi later manages to avenge his mother's death and kills the Parasite with Uda's help.
Nobuko is played by Kimiko Yo in the film.

One of Shinichi's classmates at high school. He had a crush on Murano and therefore was jealous of Shinichi, beating him up outside the gym in the anime. After Shinichi intervened while he was being jumped by Mitsuo's gang, he's changed his demeanor. Nagai is quick to jump into situations as seen when he got in Shimada's face for confronting Shinichi. The scene where Nagai assaults Shinichi after gym class, originally involved a character called Kotani. Due to Kotani being omitted from the Parasyte -the maxim- anime series, the scene was transferred to Nagai.

 A student from Kana's school and possibly her ex-boyfriend, he is jealous about his ex-girlfriend's (Kana) crush which is Shinichi.

Makiko is a young schoolgirl who lives with her parents, grandfather, and younger brother in the small town where Shinichi's father is hospitalized. Her family owns a hotel in the town where Shinichi stays for a few days, in order to be near his father. It is shown in the series that she develops a crush on Shinichi during his stay.

Uda is, like Shinichi, a human who had a Parasite merged with a part of his body other than his brain. In Uda's case, the Parasite took over the lower part of his head and face, most notably his jaw. Uda's Parasite originally does not have a name, but is later renamed . It is brash and crude, seemingly having a sense of humor, and often assumes control of Uda's mouth, distorting it into odd shapes and forcing Uda to say strange or inappropriate things. The pair befriend Shinichi and Migi, but preferring to simply avoid Parasites. Because Uda is slightly overweight and his Parasite is located in the jaw area, fights with other Parasites tend to leave him out of breath. However, because it is located in the lower part of the head, his Parasite can extend itself downward into his chest, protecting his heart (a primary target for hostile Parasites). Uda is a peaceful, easygoing man, but is shown to be nervous under pressure and highly emotional, often crying easily. He works as a hotel employee.

A private investigator hired by Reiko to spy on Shinichi and caught by Migi when he takes picture of them. When his assistant Abe goes missing, Shiro asks Shinichi to find him, and ends up recording a fight between Shinichi and a Parasite. Later his family is killed by Parasites, and in a frenzy of grief he kidnaps Reiko's infant son, leading to a critical confrontation at a park.

 The ringleader of a Parasite conspiracy to conquer humanity and the main antagonist of the latter half of the series. In order to realize his vision of culling the human race for the planet's well-being, he lends his resources and political acumen to unite the Parasites and transform the chaotic "Mincemeat Murders" into a streamlined process of mass slaughter. Aside from his professed environmentalism and his deep-rooted hatred of humanity, nothing is revealed about his character or background.

Mid-way through the series, Hirokawa is elected mayor of East Fukuyama City, a municipality near Shinichi's hometown. Subsequently, he uses his authority to set up safehouses where the Parasites can kill and eat humans with impunity. After Shinichi and Migi disrupt the operation of one of these facilities, Hirokawa targets them for elimination. Eventually, he and most of the Parasites comprising his organization are killed by a police taskforce once their plans are uncovered by the authorities.

A veteran detective who first suspected Shinichi for Kana's death.

A police officer assigned to the Parasyte Extermination Squad, who is eventually beheaded by Gotou.

An old woman who gave shelter to Shinichi after his fight with Gotou in the forest. After staying for a while, he left to have the final confrontation with Gotou.

Parasites
The antagonists of the series. The Parasites are creatures of unknown origin which start off as worm-like creatures that instinctively enter the body of the nearest life form and travel to the brain to completely assimilate it while destroying the host's identity in the process. From there, using the vital organs of the host bodies to survive, the Parasites would be driven with a need to kill humans and Parasites with failed host bodies. After assimilating their host, Parasites exhibit a variety of abilities that make them dangerous adversaries: the immediate area around their entry site (typically the head) is morphed into a versatile "parasite tissue" which can take a variety of offensive and defensive forms, and a parasite that successfully takes over a host's brain can then maximize the physical potential of that host.  In general, Parasite intelligence is comparable to humans, though their thought process is strictly rational and cold, with very little emotion.  They are also capable of learning extremely quickly depending on their environment – Migi, for example, mastered Japanese after one night of reading books on the subject.  While most Parasites initially acted alone, causing a chain of multiple grisly deaths coined the "mincemeat murders", they eventually form groups for safety in numbers. By the time of the final chapter, Shinichi speculating that they might have been created as an evolutionary countermeasure to humans, the surviving Parasites are assumed to have gone into hiding and adopt themselves further into human society to keep their activities to a minimum.

An extremely intelligent, ruthless Parasite and the main antagonist of the story's first half. She originally infected and took on the identity of a woman named , one of Shinichi's high school teachers. Unlike most of her kind, she is motivated by scientific inclinations with a drive to understand her kind's biology, origin, and purpose. She learned that she is pregnant with a normal human infant as a consequence of being impregnated by Mr. A, deeming it interesting while forced to quit to avoid unwanted attention resulting from it. Though she intended to kill Shinichi soon after, she lets him and Migi live unmolested largely because she finds them an interesting anomaly worthy of study. After killing off Ryōko's parents when they saw through her, the Parasite alters her face and creates the identity of "Reiko Tamura" while aligning herself with Takeshi Hirokawa. She eventually gives birth to Mr. A's baby and later kills three of her fellow Parasites when they deemed her actions with a hired detective a threat to their plans. It was after Reiko killed the maddened detective to save her child that she allowed the police to brutally gun her down in a park instead of trying to resist or escape. The baby survives because of her protection and decision not to fight back against or run away from the police. 
Tamura is portrayed by Eri Fukatsu in the film.

A Parasite who attacks Shinichi and tries to coerce Migi into relocating to his arm in order to extend his own lifespan. To his surprise, Migi kills him on the pretense that relocation is too risky to try.

 A highly aggressive Parasite aligned with Reiko Tamura. When first introduced, he (or rather, his host body) fathers a child with Reiko as part of the latter's experiment. Described by Migi as "not one of our smart ones" and called a fool by Reiko, Mr. A is extremely impulsive and animalistic. He has little capacity for caution or forethought as evidenced when he butchers several people in the presence of witnesses without hesitation. Shinichi is forced to battle Mr. A when he attempts to hunt Shinichi down and kill him at school. Though Shinichi and Migi mortally wound him, they are forced to flee before they can kill him. Mr. A attempts to find Reiko to transfer himself to her body and survive, but she rigs the room to explode to completely destroy him to preserve her human cover.

A Parasite with the body of a young adult and a major antagonist. On Reiko's suggestion, Hideo enrolls in Shinichi's high school to monitor his activities. Despite being one of the more pragmatic of his species, he has no qualms feeding on humans or otherwise killing them if they annoy or threaten to expose him. Ultimately, his single-minded desire to preserve his cover at any cost lead him to become a direct threat to Shinichi's loved ones.

When first introduced, Hideo Shimada is asked by Reiko to monitor Shinichi in order to confirm he poses no threat to their kind. Subsequently, Hideo enrolls in Shinichi's high school and expresses a desire to become friends with Shinichi, who does not trust him. Despite professing a willingness to peacefully coexist with humanity, he nearly kills a group of bullies who try to start fights with him, and continues to prey on humans. When Yuko uncovered his secret and confronts him about it, Hideo attempts to kill her only for Yuko to escape by dousing him in paint-thinner. The paint-thinner's chemical make-up disrupts Hideo's Parasite cells, causing him to go on an involuntary killing spree across the school. He is killed after he escapes to the roof, when Shinichi, using Migi to enhance his right arm's strength, throws a well-aimed stone through his chest, destroying his heart.
Shimada is played by Masahiro Higashide in the film, where Shinichi and Migi kills him not by throwing a stone, but piercing his chest with a arrow-like bar shot thanks to Migi, who uses his body to create a bow.

 The strongest Parasite and one of the series' major antagonists. His host body contains 4 additional Parasites that are completely under his control. Since most of his body mass is parasite tissue, he can achieve feats of strength and agility far in excess of normal parasites and render nearly every inch of his skin impervious to gunfire and edged weapons. Despite being one of the more intelligent of his kind, Gotou is also one of the most violent. Whereas most Parasites kill humans to feed or eliminate threats, he often hunts them sheerly for sport. Nonetheless, Gotou does possess his own peculiar code of honor as seen when he commends opponents for getting past his defenses and seeks vengeance against Shinichi for his role in his comrades’ massacre at East Fukuyama City Hall.

Gotou is introduced as the chief enforcer and right-hand man of Takeshi Hirokawa, the leader of a Parasite conspiracy to conquer humanity. After Shinichi and Migi attack one of his organization’s "dining areas", Gotou is tasked with eliminating them. Despite easily overwhelming the two in combat, they narrowly manage to escape. Later, when Hirokawa and his group are killed in an SAT operation, Gotou singlehandedly wipes out most of the attacking police forces before once again targeting Shinichi and Migi. During their rematch, Gotou absorbs Migi after the latter sacrifices himself so Shinichi can retreat. During the story’s climax, Shinichi poisons him by stabbing one of his few vulnerable areas with a pipe contaminated with toxins. As a result, Gotou loses control of the other Parasites in his body thereby enabling Migi to break free and help Shinichi finally defeat him.

 One of the Parasites that composes Gotou's body. Similar to "Migi", Miki's default position in the body is the right arm. His name has an additional meaning, which means "Three trees", referencing how he is only able to manipulate 3 Parasites in the body (including himself) when he takes the head position. Unlike other Parasites, Miki has learned to show emotions just like humans. His body is composed of five Parasites, one in each of his arms and legs and another in his head, they can apparently swap their places in the body but only two of them are able to unify the five and make them fight as a single being.

A Parasite that allied himself with Reiko Tamura along with two others named "Hikawa" and "Maesawa." He later grows distrustful of Reiko Tamura when she argues against the notion of killing Shinichi despite the threat he poses to them. As Kusano's doubts about Reiko increase, he attempts to assassinate her with help from Maesawa and Hikawa. But his underestimation of Reiko's abilities results in the death of himself and his conspirators.

Names in Tokyopop publication
In the Tokyopop publication the main character's name was Shin and his hand was called "Lefty", as the image had been flipped to read left to right. Satomi Murano is Sara. Jaw, Uda's Parasite, is referred to as Jaws, in reference to the film Jaws by Steven Spielberg. Reiko is known as Tamara Rockford in the Tokyopop version. Gotō's name was written without a macron.

References

External links
 Official manga website at Afternoon 
 Official anime website 

Parasyte
Parasyte